Alisa Marzatte Burras (born June 23, 1975) is a former professional women's basketball player.

She was born and raised in Chicago, Illinois and played for Westark Community College in Fort Smith, Arkansas from 1994 to 1996 and helped lead the Lady Lions to the 1995 JUCO National Championship. She left Westark with school records for points (1481), rebounds (534), and blocks (121). Legendary coach Leon Barmore offered Burras a scholarship to play for Louisiana Tech University, and she played with the Lady Techsters from 1996 to 1998. Burras led LA Tech to the NCAA Championship Game in 1998 but lost to Tennessee 93–74. In the championship game, she posted 19 points and 10 rebounds for the Lady Techsters. During her two seasons at LA Tech, the Lady Techsters compiled a 62–8 record. Burras was drafted in the first round (fifth overall) by the Colorado Xplosion in the 1998 ABL Draft. When the ABL folded, she was signed by the WNBA and allocated to the Cleveland Rockers on May 11, 1999. After the 1999 season, Burras was selected in the first round (fourth overall) of the December 1999 WNBA Expansion Draft by the Portland Fire. She played for the Fire for 3 seasons until the franchise folded and was then selected in the first round (ninth overall) of the 2003 WNBA Dispersal Draft by the Seattle Storm. Burras retired after the 2003 season.

Honors
 University of Arkansas-Fort Smith Hall of Fame (2011)

References

External links
 
 

1975 births
Living people
All-American college women's basketball players
American women's basketball players
Arkansas–Fort Smith Lady Lions basketball players
Basketball players from Chicago
Centers (basketball)
Cleveland Rockers players
Colorado Xplosion players
Junior college women's basketball players in the United States
Louisiana Tech Lady Techsters basketball players
Portland Fire players
Seattle Storm players
21st-century American women